Monticello High School is a four-year public high school in Monticello, New York.

According to state test scores, 93% of students are at least proficient in math and 92% in reading.

Notable alumni
Stephanie Blythe opera singer
Lawrence H. Cooke, Chief Judges of the New York Court of Appeals
Judith Kaye first woman to serve as Chief Judge of the New York State Court System
Danielle Johnson electronic musician
Gene D. Block, Chancellor of UCLA.

References

Public high schools in New York (state)
Schools in Sullivan County, New York